The Swifts is an aerobatic demonstrator team of the Russian Air Force, formed on 6 May 1991. The team currently performs with 6 MiG-29/29UB aircraft.

Team roster

The team roster today unchanged since 2008.  According to the Russian conventions surnames are listed first, followed by first name and patronymic:
Selutin Viktor Markovich, Guards colonel, “Strizhi” aerobatic team commander. Tail wingman, team leader
Morozov Valeriy Anatolyevich, Guards lieutenant colonel, “Strizhi” aerobatic team master pilot. Team leader
Sokolov Igor Evgenevich, Guards lieutenant colonel, aerobatic team deputy commander. Left wingman
Osyaikin Sergey Ivanovich, Guards lieutenant colonel, “Strizhi” aerobatic team master pilot. Right wingman
Koposov Dmitriy Alexandrovich,  Guards lieutenant colonel, aerobatic team deputy commander. Right wingman, single aerobatic, extreme flying
Prohorov Aleksey Vladimirovich, Guards lieutenant colonel, “Strizhi” aerobatic team master pilot, left wingman
Vasiliev Sergey Alekseevich, Guards lieutenant colonel, “Strizhi” aerobatic team master pilot
Kuznetsov Denis, Captain, “Strizhi” aerobatic team pilot

See also
 Soviet air shows
 MAKS Air Show
 Russian Knights

References

External links

 Strizhi official website (Russian language)
 Russian aerobatic team Strizhi on Aerobaticteams.net

Units and formations of the Russian Air Force
Units and formations of the Soviet Air Forces
Aerobatic teams
1991 establishments in the Soviet Union
Russian ceremonial units